The 2020–21 Vijay Hazare Trophy was the 19th season of the Vijay Hazare Trophy, a List A cricket tournament in India. It was contested by 38 teams, divided into six groups, with six teams in Group C. Bihar, Karnataka, Kerala, Odisha, Railways and Uttar Pradesh were placed in Group C, with all the matches taking place in Bangalore. Karnataka won Group C to qualify for the knockout stage of the tournament. Uttar Pradesh and Kerala qualified for the knockout stage as the next two best-placed teams.

Points table

Fixtures

Round 1

Round 2

Round 3

Round 4

Round 5

References

Vijay Hazare Trophy
Vijay Hazare Trophy